A barbarian is to a person who is perceived to be uncivilized or primitive.

Barbarian may also refer to:

Sports
 Barbarian F.C. or the Barbarians, an invitational rugby union team based in Britain: 
 Australian Barbarians
 Barbarian Rugby Club, more commonly known as the French Barbarians
 Brussels Barbarians
 New Zealand Barbarians
 South African Barbarians
 The Barbarian (wrestler) (born 1958), ring name of professional wrestler Sione Vailahi

Games
 Barbarian: The Ultimate Warrior, a 1987 fighting game by Palace Software
 Barbarian (1987 video game), a 1987 platform game by Psygnosis/Melbourne House
 Barbarian (2002 video game), a 2002 fighting game by Titus
 Barbarian (Dungeons & Dragons), a character class in the fantasy game
 The Barbarians (board game), a 1981 board game
 Barbarian, a character class in Diablo II, and Diablo III
 Barbarian, a troop from the mobile strategy game Clash of Clans and Clash Royale

Arts and entertainment
 Barbarians, a series of comics published by Atlas/Seaboard Comics
 The Barbarians, an opera by Constantine Koukias based on a poem by Constantine P. Cavafy
 The Barbarians, a series of novels set in the Dragonlance realm
 The Barbarians (painting), a 1937 painting by German Surrealist Max Ernst

Music
 The Barbarians (band), an 1960s American garage band
 "The Barbarian" (song), a 1970 piece from Emerson, Lake & Palmer, after Béla Bartók's Allegro barbaro
 "The Barbarians", a 2021 song by Greta Van Fleet from their album The Battle at Garden's Gate
 "Barbarian", a 1981 song by INXS from their album Underneath the Colours
 "Barbarian", a 2005 song by August Burns Red from their album Thrill Seeker
 "Barbarian", a 2011 song by E-40 from his album Revenue Retrievin': Graveyard Shift
 "Barbarian", a 2015 song by The Darkness from their album Last of Our Kind
 "Barbarians", a 2015 song by The Libertines from their album Anthems for Doomed Youth
 "Barbarian", a 2022 song by Lil Durk from his album 7220

Film
 The Barbarian (1920 film), an American silent drama based on a short story by Theodore Seixas Solomons
 The Barbarian (1933 film), also titled A Night in Cairo, an American romantic drama starring Ramon Novarro
 Barbarians (1953 film), a Soviet drama based on Maxim Gorky's 1905 play of the same name
 The Barbarians (1960 film), also titled Revak the Rebel, a historical epic starring Jack Palance
 The Barbarians (1987 film), an English-language swords-and-sorcery film, an American-Italian co-production
 Barbarian, a 2003 American sword-and-sorcery film starring Michael O'Hearn and Martin Kove
 Barbarians (2021 film), a British thriller film
 Barbarian (2022 film), an American horror film

Television
 Barbarians (miniseries), a 2004 History Channel documentary TV series about invading tribes during the Roman Empire
 Terry Jones' Barbarians, a 2006 BBC documentary TV series about Roman and Roman Catholic notion of barbarians
 Barbarians (2020 TV series), a German TV series set during the Roman Empire's occupation of Germania

See also
 Barbaria (disambiguation)
 Barbaric, a fictional superhero from Image Comic's Freak Force
 Barbarism (disambiguation)
 Berbers, an ethnicity of several nations in Africa
 Conan the Barbarian, a fictional character created by Robert E. Howard
 Dave the Barbarian, an American TV series
 John Nord (born 1959), professional wrestler, ring name "Nord the Barbarian"
 234 Barbara, the prototype of a class of asteroids known as "Barbarians"